Gvidas Sabeckis (born March 27, 1984) is a Lithuanian professional tennis player. He was number one Lithuanian in ATP ranking for 144 weeks and a member of Lithuania Davis Cup team for eight years.

ITF Men's Circuit career finals

Singles

Doubles

Davis Cup 
Sabeckis was a member of the Lithuania Davis Cup team, he has an 11–7 record in singles and a 12–14 record in doubles in 31 ties played. Also, he partnering Daniel Lencina-Ribes is the best doubles team that ever represented Lithuania, together they have a 6–4 record.

External links

References

Lithuanian male tennis players
1984 births
Living people
People from Prienai
21st-century Lithuanian people